A paddock is an enclosure for horses.

Paddock may also refer to:

Places 
 Paddock, Huddersfield, suburb in England
 Paddock, Nebraska (disambiguation), two unincorporated communities
 Paddock, Holt County, Nebraska
 Paddock, Merrick County, Nebraska
 Paddock (war rooms), a two-level concrete citadel in Dollis Hill, north London, serving as war rooms for Winston Churchill during World War II
 Paddock Building, a historic commercial building in Malone, Franklin County, New York
 Paddock Centre, a unit of Broadmoor Hospital
 Paddock Farm, a historic farmstead in Holden, Massachusetts, United States
 Paddock Mall, an enclosed shopping mall in Ocala, Florida
 Paddock Mansion, historic home located at Watertown in Jefferson County, New York
 Paddock Township (disambiguation)
 Paddock Wood, village in Kent, England
 The Paddocks, a farmhouse listed with Historic England

People 
 Paddock (surname), a surname

Other uses 
 Paddock (field), a type of agricultural field
 Paddock, the enclosed area where vehicles are paraded before a motorsport event
 Paddock, the enclosed area at a race track where horses are paraded and mounted before a race, and unsaddled after a race
 Paddock, a toad
 Paddock Shops, a shopping center in Louisville, Kentucky

ko:예시장
ja:パドック